SS Alfred I. Dupont was a Liberty ship built in the United States during World War II. She was named after Alfred I. Dupont, an American industrialist, financier, philanthropist and a member of the influential Du Pont family.

Construction
Alfred I. Dupont was laid down on 1 July 1944, under a Maritime Commission (MARCOM) contract, MC hull 2490, by the St. Johns River Shipbuilding Company, Jacksonville, Florida; she was sponsored by Jessie Ball duPont, the widow of the namesake, and was launched on 15 August 1944.

History
She was allocated to the International Freigting Corp., on 28 August 1944. On 25 November 1947, she was laid up in the National Defense Reserve Fleet, Mobile, Alabama. She was removed from the fleet, 13 August 1970.

References

Bibliography

 
 
 
 

 

Liberty ships
Ships built in Jacksonville, Florida
1944 ships
Mobile Reserve Fleet